Seniman Bujang Lapok (The Three Worn Out Actor Bachelors, also known in the film as The Nitwit Movie Stars) is a 1961 Malay comedy film directed by P. Ramlee. It is the fourth instalment in the Bujang Lapok series of films, but the last to feature P. Ramlee, S. Shamsuddin and Aziz Sattar as the main trio of actors. However, it is not a direct sequel to the previous "Bujang Lapok" films, as there are no references to the events of the previous films.

The film is a self-referential spoof of the Malay film industry of the late 1950s to early 1960s. The plot revolves around the main trio attempting to become actors and break into the film business, and hence features a fictionalised look at the behind-the-scenes process of Malay film-making during that time. The line between reality and fiction is blurred as real film industry places are used, real film sets of previous Malay films are used for the film-within-the-film, and all the featured actors use their real-life names or derivatives thereof.

Plot
The "bujang lapok" trio of Ramli, Sudin and Ajis go to Jalan Ampas Studio in Singapore in response to an open call audition. After meeting the manager, the trio enter the studio where they crashed a filming of “Yatim Tua dan Setan Angkat Dulang”. Before they were chased out, the manager intervene to explain to the director on site, Ahmad Nisfu, the trio are applying for an audition as actors. The director ordered scripts to be written for the trio and prepares an audition. During their audition, they drive the director crazy by forgetting their scripts and improvising with their own lines. However, the studio boss likes their natural comedic talent and tells the director that the trio are to be signed on for an oncoming film. The three of them are themselves taken by surprise but are nonetheless pleased at the outcome.

Most of the movie centre around their lives in a house shared with other tenants (they all each rent a room). During their first evening memorising scripts for their new movie, they encounter one disruption after another. First, it was the husband and wife dancing to loud music, then it's the neighbour with the motorcycle problems, then it's the fat drunk trumpeter who is practising his instrument a bit too loudly. After dealing with each problematic neighbour in their own unique way, they then settle down to memorise their lines.

The following day, filming begins on their new movie. Despite having learned their lines, they fumble through them and end up infuriating the director so much that he collapses. He is brought to the hospital where he is diagnosed with stress and released. The three bachelors are on hand to visit him with flowers in hand. Initially pleased with the visit, he collapses again when he sees them, the ones who made him collapse in the first place.

Back at home, they are greeted by Salmah, their next door neighbour, and the object of Ramli's affections. They banter to and fro and then Salmah runs off from the room in tears whilst trying to tell Ramli something. When they meet later that night, Salmah tells Ramli that someone has come to ask for her hand in marriage. When she reveals the person, it is Sharif Dol, a bully from a neighbouring village, who has been harassing Salmah for some time. He then appears at the scene and starts taunting Ramli and Salmah. Ramli tells Salmah to go home whilst he deals with Shariff Dol and challenges him to a fight. Back at the room, both Sudin and Ajis wait for him back at their room with food on the table. Sudin is already hungry but it is their agreement that they always eat together, the three of them. Unwilling to wait for him any more, Sudin wants to go and look for Ramli and they leave their dinner to find Ramli all bruised and passed out at his usual meeting place with Salmah. After settling him down, Sudin brings out some of the dinner that he has brought with him and the three of them enjoy them together.

The next day, Salmah and her mother receives a visit from Shariff Dol and his mother. They begin discussing the terms of the wedding and Shariff Dol gives Salmah's mother some money to tide her over until the big day. Salmah keeps silent but shows her disapproval to Shariff Dol from across the room. Later on that day, Sudin and Ajis go on their separate adventures in the evening whilst Ramli and Salmah lament their love for each other. When both of them return, they tell Ramli about their evening whilst he looks on in silence. When asked, he tells them that he wants to marry but doesn't have the money to do so. Sudin then tells him he has the answer for it and produces a 'magic stone' he had purchased earlier in the evening by a roadside seller who assures him that with a little ritual, all his deepest wishes will be fulfilled. Ramli is consoled and thanks Sudin for being a good friend.

Later on during the night, they each encounter some more of their neighbours' antics, one involving a policeman and another involving a dispute between an Indian husband and wife and a soiled baby diaper. They finally settle in for the night and when they wake up the next morning and make their way for their morning rituals, Ramli peeps into Salmah's room only to be scared off by her emergence from the room. The next few scenes show their lives in the village as they go about getting themselves ready to go to the film studio in their quest to fulfill Ramli's wish to be married. Sudin fails in his attempts to acquire the financial resources Ramli needs for his intended wedding and in fury, Sudin throws the magic stone into the stream. The next scene is of Salmah and her adamant refusal to marry Shariff Dol. She then reveals to her mother that he has been the one harassing her for so long and she has no wish to marry him. Salmah's mother is similarly furious and returns him the money he had given to her. Shariff Dol takes the news in stride but promises revenge for the humiliation he has endured.

Later on in the evening, Salmah informs Ramli that she has turned Shariff Dol's marriage proposal down once and for all. Ramli is pleased but Salmah wants to proceed with their marriage as they had intended to but Ramli admits to her that he has no finances to support their marriage and wedding. Salmah suggests using her savings instead and they gleefully leave for home together. When they arrive home, they find their house in flames and their neighbours running around in horror. Whilst Ramli is resigned to the fate that they will be homeless, Salmah is convinced that it is Shariff Dol's doing. She tells the same to Sudin and Ajis who round up the rest of their neighbours to find Shariff Dol and bring him to the police station. In the meantime, Ramli finds a wallet at the scene of the crime, proving that it was indeed Shariff Dol who perpetrated the crime. Ramli pursues Shariff Dol and they fight again when Ramli tells him he found his wallet at the scene of the fire. Shariff Dol eventually admits defeat when it is apparent he would not win the fight. About the same time, Salmah arrives with the rest of the angry tenants demanding justice for their burnt house. Ramli emerges from the house with Shariff Dol tied up and persuades them to surrender him to the police instead. The evening ends well for all three bachelors when all their romantic halves join them and they walk into the moonlight together.

Songs
 Menchecheh Bujang Lapok
 Gelora
 Senandung Kasih
 Embun Menitik (by late Ahmad Patek)

The songs were sung by Saloma, P. Ramlee, S.Shamsuddin, Aziz Sattar, and Pancha Sitara band.

Cast
 P. Ramlee as Ramli
 S. Shamsuddin as Sudin
 Aziz Sattar as Ajis
 Saloma as Miss Salmah
 Shariff Dol as Sharif Dol
 Ahmad Nisfu as Director Ahmad Nisfu
 H. M. Busra as Fat Trumpeting neighbor
 M. Rafee as Loud Motorcycle neighbor 
 Marian Baharom as Auntie Salmah 
 Nyong Ismail as Hang Kebun
 S. Kadarisman as Actor (Belacan scene)
 Hashimah Yon as Actress (Belacan scene)
 Kemat Hassan as Studio Manager Kemat Hassan
 S. Sudarmaji as Assistant Director
 A. Rahim as Extra Studio Actors 
 Ali Fiji as Extra Studio Actors
 Mustarjo as Extra Studio Actors 
 Ahmad C as Mr. Ahmad 
 Sarawan Singh as Mr. Singh
 Ahmad Mahmud as Doctor
 M. Zain as Indian neighbor 
 Kuswadinata as Loud Music neighbor
 Aini Jasmin as Shariff Dol's mother
 Dayang Sofia as Dayang Sofia
 Zaiton as Zaiton
 Rahayu Sudarmaji (Ayu) as Ayu 
 Leng Hussain as the Chinese Karung guni Man (Rag-and-Bone Man)

References

External links
 Seniman Bujang Lapok at FilemKita.com
 

1961 films
Malaysian black-and-white films
Singaporean black-and-white films
1961 comedy films
Malay-language films
Singaporean comedy films
Malaysian comedy films
Films about filmmaking
Films directed by P. Ramlee
Films with screenplays by P. Ramlee
Films scored by P. Ramlee
Malay Film Productions films
Films set in Singapore
Films shot in Singapore
Malaysian satirical films